Coralliophilinae is a taxonomic group, a subfamily of about 200–250 sea snails, marine gastropod mollusks commonly known as the coral snails or coral shells. This is a subfamily within the very large family Muricidae, the murex or rock snails.

According to the taxonomy of the Gastropoda (Bouchet & Rocroi, 2005), this group is considered to be a subfamily, the Coralliophilinae, of the family Muricidae.  Prior to the taxonomy of the Gastropoda (Bouchet & Rocroi, 2005), the Coralliophilinae was recognized as a distinct family the Coralliophilidae.  The subfamily Coralliophilinae is monophyletic, as confirmed by genetic research with molecular markers.

Distribution and habitat
The coral snails are coral dwellers that occur worldwide in temperate and tropical seas. They can be found in very diverse places such as the mid-Atlantic seamounts, the Canary Islands, the deep water coral banks in the Mediterranean, from the Florida Keys to Brazil, the Indo-Pacific Region, the southwest Pacific, the Austral Islands (South Pacific). Such a dispersal of the subfamily can be attributed to oceanic currents and planktotrophic larval development.

These snails are specialist feeders, feeding exclusively on anthozoans by boring into them. A few live between soft corals and anemones and use their long and extensible proboscis to ingest the soft tissue. Some feed on sea fans.

Genera
Genera within the subfamily Coralliophilinae include:
 Babelomurex Coen, 1922
 Coralliophila H. Adams & A. Adams, 1853
 Emozamia Iredale, 1929
 Hirtomurex Coen, 1922
 Latiaxis Swainson, 1840
 Leptoconchus Rüppell, 1834
 Liniaxis Laseron, 1955 
 Magilus Montfort, 1810
 Mipus de Gregorio, 1885
 Rapa Röding, 1798
 Rhizochilus Steenstrup, 1850
Genera brought into synonymy 
 Aradasia Settepassi, 1970 = synonym of Coralliophila H. Adams & A. Adams, 1853
 Aradomurex Coen, 1947 = synonym of Coralliophila H. Adams & A. Adams, 1853
 Coralliobia H. Adams & A. Adams, 1853 = synonym of Coralliophila H. Adams & A. Adams, 1853
 Echinolatiaxis Kosuge, 1979 = synonym of Babelomurex Coen, 1922
 Fusomurex Coen, 1922 = synonym of Coralliophila H. Adams & A. Adams, 1853
 Laevilatiaxis Kosuge, 1979 = synonym of Babelomurex Coen, 1922
 Lamellatiaxis Habe & Kosuge, 1970 = synonym of Babelomurex Coen, 1922
 Langfordia Dall, 1924 = synonym of Babelomurex Coen, 1922
 Latimurex  : synonym of Latiromurex Coen, 1922
 Latiromurex Coen, 1922 = synonym of Coralliophila H. Adams & A. Adams, 1853
 Lepadomurex Coen, 1922 = synonym of Coralliophila H. Adams & A. Adams, 1853
 Magilopsis G.B. Sowerby III, 1919 = synonym of Leptoconchus Rüppell, 1834
 Pseudomurex Monterosato, 1872 = synonym of Coralliophila H. Adams & A. Adams, 1853
 Quoyula Iredale, 1912 = synonym of Coralliophila H. Adams & A. Adams, 1853
 Rapella Swainson, 1840 = synonym of Rapa Röding, 1798
 Reliquiaecava Massin, 1987 = synonym of Coralliophila H. Adams & A. Adams, 1853
 Rhombothais Woolacott, 1954 = synonym of Coralliophila H. Adams & A. Adams, 1853
 Tarantellaxis Habe, 1970 = synonym of Babelomurex Coen, 1922
 Tolema Iredale, 1929 = synonym of Babelomurex Coen, 1922

Within this subfamily, the systematics at species level is problematic as many adult species show broad intraspecific morphologic variability that also depends on the substrate they live. The morphology of the protoconch is usually very helpful as a taxonomic character.

References

 Vaught, K.C. (1989). A classification of the living Mollusca. American Malacologists: Melbourne, FL (USA). . XII, 195 pp

 
Muricidae
Taxa named by Jean-Charles Chenu